The Gwangjin Bridge crosses the Han River in South Korea and connects the districts of Gwangjin-gu and Gangdong-gu. The original bridge was completed in 1936, but because of deteriorating conditions, it was rebuilt and reopened in November 2003.

References

Bridges in Seoul
Bridges completed in 1936